The 11th Aviation Battalion was a United States Army aviation unit that fought in the Vietnam War. The unit served as a test for helicopter support of ground infantry units.

History
The unit was constituted on 21 August 1965 and activated on 23 August 1965 at Fort Benning, Ga. The Battalion was inactivated on 16 September 1987. The 11th Aviation Battalion stationed at Fliegerhorst Kaserne in Erlensee, Germany, was the air wing of V Corps. The 1st Battalion, 11th Aviation Regiment, at Fort Rucker, now carries the 11th Aviation Battalion's lineage.

Organizational structure in the Vietnam War
The organizational structure of the 11th Aviation Battalion reflected the following units in 1966/7:
HQ and HQ Company at Phu Loi Base Camp
 390th Quartermaster Detachment (PETRL) at Long Binh Post
116th Assault Helicopter Company at Củ Chi Base Camp
 283rd Signal Detachment (RL) Cu Chi
 392nd Transportation Detachment (KD) at Cu Chi
 431st Medical Detachment (OA) at Cu Chi
 128th Assault Helicopter Company at Phu Loi
 285th Signal Detachment (RL) at Phu Loi
 393rd Transportation Detachment (KD) at Phu Loi
 432nd Medical Detachment (OA) at Phu Loi
 162nd Assault Helicopter Company at Phước Vĩnh Base Camp
 407th Transportation Detachment (KD) at Phuoc Vinh
 450th Signal Detachment (RL) at Phuoc Vinh
 758th Medical Detachment (OA) at Phuoc Vinh
 173rd Assault Helicopter Company at Lai Khê
 408th Transportation Detachment (KD) at Lai Khe
 451st Signal Detachment (RL) at Lai Khe
 759th Medical Detachment (OA) at Lai Khe
 178th Assault Support Helicopter Company at Phu Loi
 400th Transportation Detachment (AB) Phu Loi
 184th Reconnaissance Airplane Company at Phu Loi
 243rd Signal Detachment (RL) at Phu Loi
 205th Assault Support Helicopter Company at Phu loi
 612th Transportation Detachment (AB) at Phu Loi
 213th Combat Assault Support Helicopter Company at Phu Loi
 329th Transportation Detachment (AB) at Phu Loi
 178th Assault Support Helicopter Company at Phu Loi
 400th Transportation Detachment (AB) at Phu Loi

Commanders

In Vietnam
 LTC John W. Lauterbach, in command on 1 January 1966.
 LTC Joseph B. Starker; assumed command on 20 May 1966.
 LTC Leo E. Soucek; assumed command on 7 May 1967, later retiring as a Brigadier General.
 LTC William A. Hobbs; assumed command on 10 November 67.
 LTC William F. Bauman; assumed command on 22 April 1968.
 LTC Robert W. Flint, in command on 31 January 1970.

In Germany
 Tommy Stiner

Awards and decorations

Campaign credit

Unit decorations

References

Sources
Department of the Army (29 January 1988). Pamphlet 672–3, page 17. Accessed 8 May 2017.

Military units and formations established in 1965
Military units and formations disestablished in 1987
Military units and formations of the United States Army in the Vietnam War